Mohit Daga (born 15 August 1982) is an Indian television actor. He is best known for his roles in Bhaskar Bharti, Aise Karo Naa Vidaa, Bairi Piya, Ek Mutthi Aasmaan and Tera Yaar Hoon Main.

Early life and education 
Mohit Daga was born in a Jain family in Gadarwara, Madhya Pradesh.

Acting career 
Influenced by his aunt Nilmani Desai Mohit Daga joined a modelling workshop in Pune. Thereafter he came to Mumbai in 2002 to join an acting workshop and got a small role in a serial named Kammal. With the dream of making a mark in the silver screen, Mohit joined Zee Cinestarts Ki Khoj a reality show in 2004 and finished as finalist there.

After Zee Cinestarts Ki Khoj, Mohit tried his luck in films for few years but destiny had some other plan for him. He found fame with Akbar Birbal Remixed, India's first show for the web and mobile produced by Rajshree Media in 2007. There after he has appeared in many television shows like Love Story (2007), Left Right Left (2008), Bhaskar Bharti (2009), Aise Karo Naa Vidaa (2010), Bairi Piya (2010) and Ek Mutthi Aasmaan (2013/14). He appeared in Aapke Aa Jane Se (2018) on Zee TV. He also acted in web series Faceless in 2019 on Jio Cinema. He is currently seen in Shashi Sumeet Production's Tera Yaar Hoon Main since December 2020.

Filmography

Television

Web series

Awards and nominations

Personal life 
Mohit Daga belongs to a family of agriculture hardware business. He worked for family business for before joining films. He is married to Shweta Dagga. Together they have a daughter named Ashwika Dagga. He is trained in kick boxing, martial art and taekwondo.

References

External links 
 https://www.imdb.com/name/nm8457561/
 https://nettv4u.com/celebrity/hindi/tv-actor/mohit-dagga
 https://www.charmboard.com/en/scene/mohit-dagga-cast-in-aap-ke-aa-jane-se-episode-15-2018/p/5a74a6d6f6464ff82c5947b0-471194

Living people
Actors from Madhya Pradesh
Indian male television actors
1982 births